Tawfiq Buhimed (born 29 October 1987) is a professional football winger and full-back for Al-Fateh.

References

External links 
 

Living people
People from Al-Hasa
Association football midfielders
Saudi Arabian footballers
1987 births
Hajer FC players
Ettifaq FC players
Al-Fateh SC players
Al-Qarah FC players
Al-Fayha FC players
Saudi First Division League players
Saudi Professional League players
Saudi Fourth Division players
Saudi Arabian Shia Muslims